Afgekia mahidoliae, known as kan phai Mahidol, is a type of vine in the family Fabaceae. It is found in Kanchanaburi province, Thailand. Its leaves are compound with 4–6 pairs of leaflets. The stem has several petiolules. The dorsal side of the leaf has brown colored hairs. The flower is an erect panicle with white and purple color. The pod is flat, short and round. Its scientific name is given in the honor of her Royal Highness Princess Srinagarindra, the Princess Mother.

This vine was first scientifically described in Thailand by Kasem Chandraprasong, then Assistant Professor Jirayupin (Chirmsiriwattana) Chadraprasong and Mr. B. L. Burtt published its description and name and called it "kan phai Mahidol".

The plant has been made the symbolic plant of Mahidol university on February 19, 1999. The reasons were that it was discovered in Thailand, is easy to plant, it was a felicitous name and similar to the university's name. Moreover, although it is a vine, it has beautiful traits, can be set in to various types of bushes, has long life span as it can sprout anew after withering away. The vine's characteristics signifies prosperity and ability to adapt to changing environment.

References 

 Kew Science: Plants of the World Online
 
  Plant encyclopedia of Thailand

Wisterieae
Flora of Thailand